Clathria (Clathria) is a subgenus of demosponge in the family Microcionidae.

Species 
Species in the subgenus include (130):
  (Hoshino, 1981)
 Clathria (Clathria) acanthotoxa (Stephens, 1916)
 Clathria (Clathria) angulifera Dendy, 1896
 Clathria (Clathria) anthoides Lévi, 1993
 Clathria (Clathria) antyaja (Burton & Rao, 1932)
 Clathria (Clathria) arbuscula (Row, 1911)
 Clathria (Clathria) arcifera (Schmidt, 1868)
 Clathria (Clathria) arcuophora Whitelegge, 1907
 Clathria (Clathria) arroyoi Uriz, 1984
 Clathria (Clathria) asodes (de Laubenfels, 1930)
 Clathria (Clathria) axociona Lévi, 1963
 Clathria (Clathria) barleei (Bowerbank, 1866)
 Clathria (Clathria) basilana Lévi, 1961
 Clathria (Clathria) bergquistae Van Soest & Hooper, 2020
 Clathria (Clathria) biclathrata Hooper in Hooper & Wiedenmayer, 1994
 Clathria (Clathria) borealis Hooper, 1996
 Clathria (Clathria) bulbosa Hooper & Lévi, 1993
 Clathria (Clathria) burtoni Cuartas, 1995
 Clathria (Clathria) caelata Hallmann, 1912
 Clathria (Clathria) calopora Whitelegge, 1907
 Clathria (Clathria) calypso Boury-Esnault, 1973
 Clathria (Clathria) carteri Topsent, 1889
 Clathria (Clathria) chelifera (Hentschel, 1911)
 Clathria (Clathria) compressa Schmidt, 1862
 Clathria (Clathria) conectens (Hallmann, 1912)
 Clathria (Clathria) conica Lévi, 1963
 Clathria (Clathria) contorta (Bergquist & Fromont, 1988)
 Clathria (Clathria) coralloides (Scopoli, 1772)
 Clathria (Clathria) crassa (Lendenfeld, 1887)
 Clathria (Clathria) dayi Lévi, 1963, the broad-bladed tree sponge
 Clathria (Clathria) decumbens Ridley, 1884
 Clathria (Clathria) depressa Sarà & Melone, 1966
 Clathria (Clathria) discreta (Thiele, 1905)
 Clathria (Clathria) echinonematissima (Carter, 1887)
 Clathria (Clathria) elastica Lévi, 1963
 Clathria (Clathria) elegans Vosmaer, 1880
 Clathria (Clathria) faviformis Lehnert & van Soest, 1996
 Clathria (Clathria) foliacea Topsent, 1889
 Clathria (Clathria) foliascens Vacelet & Vasseur, 1971
 Clathria (Clathria) frondiculata (Schmidt, 1864)
 Clathria (Clathria) gageoensis Kim & Sim, 2005
 Clathria (Clathria) gombawuiensis Kim & Sim, 2005
 Clathria (Clathria) gomezae Van Soest, 2017
 Clathria (Clathria) gorgonioides (Dendy, 1916)
 Clathria (Clathria) hexagonopora Lévi, 1963
 Clathria (Clathria) hispidula (Ridley, 1884)
 Clathria (Clathria) hjorti (Arnesen, 1920)
 Clathria (Clathria) hongdoensis Kim & Sim, 2006
 Clathria (Clathria) horrida (Row, 1911)
 Clathria (Clathria) ieoensis Kang & Kim, 2018
 Clathria (Clathria) inanchorata Ridley & Dendy, 1886
 Clathria (Clathria) indica Dendy, 1889
 Clathria (Clathria) inhacensis Thomas, 1979
 Clathria (Clathria) intermedia Kirk, 1911
 Clathria (Clathria) irregularis (Burton, 1931)
 Clathria (Clathria) juncea Burton, 1931
 Clathria (Clathria) koreana Sim & Lee, 1998
 Clathria (Clathria) kylista Hooper & Lévi, 1993
 Clathria (Clathria) laevigata Lambe, 1893
 Clathria (Clathria) lipochela Burton, 1932
 Clathria (Clathria) lissosclera Bergquist & Fromont, 1988
 Clathria (Clathria) lobata Vosmaer, 1880
 Clathria (Clathria) macroisochela Lévi, 1993
 Clathria (Clathria) maeandrina Ridley, 1884
 Clathria (Clathria) marissuperi Pulitzer-Finali, 1983
 Clathria (Clathria) menoui Hooper & Lévi, 1993
 Clathria (Clathria) meyeri (Bowerbank, 1877)
 Clathria (Clathria) microchela (Stephens, 1916)
 Clathria (Clathria) microxa Desqueyroux, 1972
 Clathria (Clathria) mortenseni (Brøndsted, 1924)
 Clathria (Clathria) mosulpia Sim & Byeon, 1989
 Clathria (Clathria) multiformis Samaai, Pillay & Janson, 2019
 Clathria (Clathria) multipes Hallmann, 1912
 Clathria (Clathria) murphyi Hooper, 1996
 Clathria (Clathria) nicoleae Vieira de Barros, Santos & Pinheiro, 2013
 Clathria (Clathria) noarlungae Hooper, 1996
 Clathria (Clathria) obliqua (George & Wilson, 1919)
 Clathria (Clathria) oculata Burton, 1933
 Clathria (Clathria) omegiensis Samaai & Gibbons, 2005
 Clathria (Clathria) oxyphila (Hallmann, 1912)
 Clathria (Clathria) pachystyla Lévi, 1963
 Clathria (Clathria) papillosa Thiele, 1905
 Clathria (Clathria) partita Hallmann, 1912
 Clathria (Clathria) parva Lévi, 1963
 Clathria (Clathria) paucispicula (Burton, 1932)
 Clathria (Clathria) pauper Brøndsted, 1927
 Clathria (Clathria) pellicula Whitelegge, 1897
 Clathria (Clathria) perforata (Lendenfeld, 1887)
 Clathria (Clathria) piniformis (Carter, 1885)
 Clathria (Clathria) plurityla Pulitzer-Finali, 1983
 Clathria (Clathria) priestleyae Goodwin, Berman & Hendry, 2019
 Clathria (Clathria) productitoxa (Hoshino, 1981)
 Clathria (Clathria) prolifera (Ellis & Solander, 1786), the red beard sponge
 Clathria (Clathria) pyramidalis (Brøndsted, 1924)
 Clathria (Clathria) ramsayiensis Samaai, Pillay & Janson, 2019
 Clathria (Clathria) ramus Kang & Kim, 2018
 Clathria (Clathria) raphanus (Lamarck, 1814)
 Clathria (Clathria) rectangulosa Schmidt, 1870
 Clathria (Clathria) rhaphidotoxa Stephens, 1915
 Clathria (Clathria) rubens (Lendenfeld, 1888)
 Clathria (Clathria) sarai Hooper, 1996
 Clathria (Clathria) saraspinifera Hooper, 1996
 Clathria (Clathria) sartaginula (Lamarck, 1814)
 Clathria (Clathria) shirahama Tanita, 1977
 Clathria (Clathria) sohuksanensis Kim & Sim, 2006
 Clathria (Clathria) spinispicula Tanita, 1968
 Clathria (Clathria) spongodes Dendy, 1922
 Clathria (Clathria) squalorum Wiedenmayer in Hooper & Wiedenmayer, 1994
 Clathria (Clathria) striata Whitelegge, 1907
 Clathria (Clathria) stromnessa Goodwin, Brewin & Brickle, 2012
 Clathria (Clathria) terraenovae Dendy, 1924
 Clathria (Clathria) tortuosa Uriz, 1988
 Clathria (Clathria) toxipraedita Topsent, 1913
 Clathria (Clathria) toxistricta Topsent, 1925
 Clathria (Clathria) toxistyla (Sarà, 1959)
 Clathria (Clathria) toxivaria (Sarà, 1959)
 Clathria (Clathria) transiens Hallmann, 1912
 Clathria (Clathria) typica sensu Kirkpatrick, 1903
 Clathria (Clathria) ulmus Vosmaer, 1880
 Clathria (Clathria) unica Cuartas, 1992
 Clathria (Clathria) vasiformis (de Laubenfels, 1953)
 Clathria (Clathria) whiteleggii Dendy, 1922
 Clathria (Clathria) wilsoni Wiedenmayer, 1989
 Clathria (Clathria) zoanthifera Lévi, 1963

References 

Poecilosclerida
Animal subgenera